Luxmoore, also Luxmore, is an English language surname. Notable people with these names include:

Sir Fairfax Luxmoore (1876–1944), British barrister and judge
 Charles Scott Luxmoore (1794–1854), Anglican priest
 Christopher Luxmoore (1926–2014), Bishop of Bermuda
 Ernest Marshall Luxmoore (1883–1972), prominent member of Adelaide Hunt Club 
 John Luxmoore or Luxmore (1766–1830), English bishop, father of Charles Luxmoore
 Percy Luxmoore, briefly captain of HMS Malabar (1866)
 Philip Bouverie Luxmoore, remembered in Mount Luxmore on the South Island of New Zealand
 T. J. Luxmore, Canadian ice hockey referee

The Luxmoore family was prominent in Stafford, Dolton